Joseph Diestel (January 27, 1943 – August 17, 2017) was an American mathematician and Professor of Mathematics at Kent State University. In addition to his contribution to functional analysis, particularly Banach space theory and the theory of vector measures, Diestel was known for a number of highly influential textbooks: in 1975 he published "Lecture Notes Geometry of Banach Spaces—Selected Topics"; in 1977 he published "Vector Measures" with J. Jerry Uhl; in 1984 published "Sequences and series in Banach spaces" and in 1995 he published "Absolutely summing operators" with H. Jarchow and A. Tonge; as well as a number of other books.

Diestel received his Ph.D. degree in 1969 from Catholic University of America under Victor Michael Bogdan. He had 29 graduate students and over 46 mathematical descendants.

References 

American mathematicians

1943 births
2017 deaths
Kent State University faculty
Catholic University of America alumni